Ooceraea fragosa is a species of reddish-brown army ant found in Sri Lanka, and the type species for the genus Ooceraea.

References

External links

 at antwiki.org

Dorylinae
Hymenoptera of Asia
Insects described in 1862